Albert Bristol Maginnes (April 5, 1897 – January 30, 1966) was a professional football player. He played in the National Football League in 1920 with the Canton Bulldogs and in 1921 with the New York Brickley Giants. Brickley's New York Giants are not related to the modern-day New York Giants. While with the Giants, Maginnes was teammates with his brother Dave. He was the father of Nancy Kissinger.

References

External links
 Nancy Kissinger and father Albert Bristol Maginnes

1897 births
1966 deaths
American football tackles
Players of American football from Boston
Canton Bulldogs players
New York Brickley Giants players
Lehigh Mountain Hawks football players
Place of death missing
English High School of Boston alumni